Jessica Danielle Bateman (born 1981) is an American politician who is the Representative for District 22 in the Washington House of Representatives. Elected in 2020, she assumed office on January 11, 2021, succeeding Beth Doglio.

Early life and education 
Raised by a single mother, Bateman earned an associate degree from Green River College and moved to Olympia, Washington to attend Evergreen State College. She earned a Bachelor of Arts degree in environmental studies and Master of Public Policy.

Career 
From 2012 to 2015, she worked as a legislative assistant in the Washington House of Representatives. In 2015, she was elected to the Olympia, Washington City Council and later served as Mayor Pro Tem of Olympia. After Beth Doglio announced that she would not seek re-election to the State House and instead run for Washington's 10th congressional district, Bateman announced her candidacy to succeed her. Bateman placed second in the nonpartisan blanket primary and defeated her Republican opponent, Dusty Pierpoint, in the November election. She assumed office on January 11, 2021.

References 

Living people
Democratic Party members of the Washington House of Representatives
Green River College alumni
Evergreen State College alumni
1981 births